Christine Goodwin is an American businesswoman and politician serving as a member of the Oregon House of Representatives from the 2nd district. Goodwin was appointed to the House in August 2021, succeeding Gary Leif.

Career 
Goodwin began her career as a teacher and coach at Roseburg High School. She later worked as the administrator of her husband's optometry practice. Goodwin also founded a local coffee house and fitness club. She served as an interim member of the Douglas County Board of Commissioners. Goodwin was appointed to serve as a member of the Oregon House of Representatives in August 2021, succeeding Gary Leif, who died in office. She was sworn in on August 25, 2021.

References 

Living people
People from Roseburg, Oregon
Republican Party members of the Oregon House of Representatives
Women state legislators in Oregon
Year of birth missing (living people)
21st-century American women